is a former Japanese football player who last played as a striker for J3 League side Fujieda MYFC.

Club statistics
Updated to 23 February 2017.

References

External links
Profile at Fujieda MYFC

1989 births
Living people
Osaka Sangyo University alumni
Association football people from Osaka Prefecture
Japanese footballers
J2 League players
J3 League players
Mito HollyHock players
Fujieda MYFC players
Association football forwards